Parachalciope longiplaga is a moth of the family Noctuidae first described by George Hampson in 1913. It is found in Uganda.

References

Endemic fauna of Uganda
Catocalinae
Insects of Uganda
Moths of Africa